Ron Steward is a filming TV critic and film reviewer, who started his career in the industry in the 1940s, and he packed films on trains going out to Paramount Pictures, he retired from this role in 1999.  

Steward went on to make regular appearance's  Rove Live presenting a movie review segment. in 2005 and 2006

References

Possibly living people
Australian film critics
Australian television presenters